Nicholas Kergozou De La Boessiere (born 29 April 1996) is a New Zealand racing cyclist, who currently rides for UCI Continental Team . He rode in the men's team pursuit at the 2016 UCI Track Cycling World Championships.

Major results

Track

2014
 1st  Omnium, National Junior Championships
 3rd  Team pursuit, UCI Junior World Championships
2015
 Oceania Championships
1st  Team pursuit
1st  Madison (with Cameron Karwowski)
3rd  Omnium
2016
 Oceania Championships
2nd  Individual pursuit
2nd  Team pursuit
2017
 2017–18 UCI World Cup
1st  Team pursuit – Milton
1st  Team pursuit – Santiago
 National Championships
1st  Team pursuit
2nd Madison
2nd Points race
2nd Individual pursuit
 2nd  Team pursuit, UCI World Championships
 Oceania Championships
2nd  Team pursuit
3rd  Kilometer
2018
 1st  Team pursuit – Cambridge, 2018–19 UCI World Cup
2019
 1st  Kilometer, Oceania Championships
 National Championships
1st  Kilometer
1st  Team pursuit
1st  Team sprint
 2019–20 UCI World Cup
2nd  Team pursuit – Hong Kong
3rd  Team pursuit – Cambridge
2020
 National Championships
1st  Kilometer
1st  Team pursuit
2021
 National Championships
1st  Kilometer
1st  Team pursuit

Road
2016
 1st Stage 6 Tour of the Great South Coast
2017
 5th White Spot / Delta Road Race
2022
 New Zealand Cycle Classic
1st  Points classification
 1st Stage 3

References

External links

1996 births
Living people
New Zealand male cyclists
Sportspeople from Invercargill
New Zealand track cyclists
Cyclists at the 2018 Commonwealth Games
Commonwealth Games competitors for New Zealand
20th-century New Zealand people
21st-century New Zealand people